Mesolia incertellus is a moth in the family Crambidae. It was described by Johann Leopold Theodor Friedrich Zincken in 1821. It is found in North America, where it has been recorded from Florida, Georgia, South Carolina and Illinois.

The wingspan is about 17–21 mm. Adults have been recorded on wing nearly year round in Florida.

References

Ancylolomiini
Moths described in 1821